Matthew Rossiter (born 25 September 1989) is a British international rower. He is an Olympian and has won medals at World Rowing Championships.

Profile
Rossiter was educated at Abingdon School and gained colours for the Abingdon School Boat Club. In 2008 he finished fifth in the Under-23 eights at the Junior World Championships. He continued his rowing as a student at Durham University.

His younger brother George Rossiter is a World Under 23 Championship medallist and World University Champion.

Rowing
Rossiter won a bronze medal in the coxless four at the 2017 World Championships in Sarasota, Florida. and also competed in the 2018 World Rowing Championships.

At the 2019 European Rowing Championships Rossiter was part of the team that won the gold medal in the fours.  The crew included his fellow Abingdonian Oliver Cook. The same crew then won a bronze medal at the 2019 World Rowing Championships.

In 2021, he won a second European gold medal when winning the coxless four in Varese, Italy.

In December 2022 he announced his retirement from international rowing in order to join the Americas Cup sailing team.

See also
List of Old Abingdonians

References

External links

Matthew Rossiter – British Rowing profile

1989 births
Living people
People educated at Abingdon School
British male rowers
English male rowers
World Rowing Championships medalists for Great Britain
Durham University Boat Club rowers
Alumni of St Cuthbert's Society, Durham
Rowers at the 2020 Summer Olympics